Carolina Victoria Benvenga (born 10 January 1990) is an Italian actress and television presenter.

Career

Her prominent work to date has included a lead role in the television series I liceali, as the daughter of the show's main character. In 2009 she is co-host, together with Andrea Dianetti, of the program Staraoke, broadcast on the Cartoon Network channel and in 2010 on Boing. In May 2010 she returned to the big screen with the romantic comedy film Una canzone per te, first work by director Herbert Simone Paragnani, in which she plays the role of Irene, a wealthy girl in eternal competition with the protagonist of the film, played by Emanuele Bosi. As of late 2012, Benvenga was hosting two national Italian television programs: La posta di Yoyo on Rai Yoyo, and Tiggì Gulp on Rai Gulp.

Filmography

Films

Television

References

External links

1990 births
Living people
Actresses from Rome
Italian film actresses
Italian stage actresses
Italian television actresses
Italian women singers
Italian women television presenters
21st-century Italian singers
21st-century Italian women singers